United Nations Security Council Resolution 285, adopted on September 5, 1970, at 14 words is the shortest UNSC resolution ever adopted (with one word less than 279); it reads simply "Demands the complete and immediate withdrawal of all Israeli armed forces from Lebanese territory."

The resolution was adopted by 14 votes to none, while the United States abstained.  The resolution came in the context of Palestinian insurgency in South Lebanon.

See also
 History of Lebanon
 List of United Nations Security Council Resolutions 201 to 300 (1965–1971)

References 
Text of the Resolution at undocs.org

External links
 

 0285
 0285
Palestinian insurgency in South Lebanon
1970 in Israel
1970 in Lebanon
 0285
September 1970 events